Vampire Prosecutor is a South Korean television series, starring Yeon Jung-hoon, Lee Won-jong, Lee Young-ah and Kim Joo-young. The crime procedural drama tells the story of a prosecutor who hides his identity of being a vampire and solves crimes with his special powers.

The first season aired on cable channel OCN from October 2 to December 18, 2011 on Sundays at 23:00 for 12 episodes.

The second season aired on OCN from September 9 to November 18, 2012 on Sundays at 23:00 for 11 episodes.

Series overview

Synopsis 
Min Tae-yeon is a respected prosecutor who gets bitten and becomes a vampire. His strong sense of justice and aloof personality is shaped by his own painful past. He drinks the blood of the deceased victim, even though it causes him physical pain, in order find out what happened to them and bring the perpetrator to justice. His close associate Detective Hwang Soon-bom is the only member of the team knows about his secret.

Season 1

Cast

Main characters
Yeon Jung-hoon as Min Tae-yeon, prosecutor
Lee Young-ah as Yoo Jung-in, prosecutor
Lee Won-jong as Hwang Soon-bom, detective
Kim Joo-young as Choi Dong-man, intern forensic scientist

Supporting characters
Jang Hyun-sung as Jang Chul-oh, chief prosecutor and Min's boss
Park Jae-hoon as Bartender/Ra Jae-wook
Kim Ye-jin as Soo-hee, coroner
Kim Eung-soo as Yoo Won-kook
Min Woo-hyuk as Kim Jin-ha
Oh Hee-joon as Lee Seung-hak

Guest appearances
Gong Jung-hwan as Park Hoon (ep 1, 10)
Choi Yong-min as President Gum (ep 1, 2)
Choi Ah-jin (ep 3)
Song Min-jung as Seo Ji-yeon (ep 2)
Seo Woo-jin as Oh Min-ho (ep 3)
Choi Min as Nam Gun-wook (ep 4)
Jang Young-nam as Yoon Ji-hee (ep 4, 8, 11)
Jo Jung-eun as Park Hyun-joo (ep 5)
Kim Ye-ryeong as Hyun-joo's mother (ep 5)
Yoon Gi-won as Choi Wook (ep 7)
Jung Da-hye as Yoon Se-hwa (ep 8)
Jung Eui-chul as Min Jung-woo (ep 8)
Lee Jong-hyuk as Prosecutor Jin (ep 8)
Kim Hyun-sung as Lee Jung-moon (ep 12)
Jang Gwang as Kwak No-seung
Kim Hyo-sun
Kim Jong-kook

Ratings

Season 2

Cast

Main characters
Yeon Jung-hoon as Min Tae-yeon
Lee Young-ah as Yoo Jung-in
Lee Won-jong as Hwang Soon-bom
Lee Geung-young as Jo Jung-hyun, coroner
Kim Joo-young as Choi Dong-man
Kwon Hyun-sang as L

Supporting characters
Gong Jung-hwan as Park Hoon/Kim Sung-hoon
Park Jae-hoon as Ra Jae-wook
Kim Bo-young as Joo Hyun-ah, chief prosecutor
Yuriko Yoshitaka as Luna
Kim Ji-young as Lee Ji-ae
Seo Soo-min as Jo Hye-in

Guest appearances
Kim Jong-gu as Heo Hak-beom (ep 1)
Song Ji-hyun as Oh Min-young (ep 2)
Kim In-seo as Bae Ji-yeon (ep 2)
Jeon Hee-soo as young Ji-yeon (ep 2)
Lee Ji-oh as young Jo Jung-hyun (ep 3)
Hong Seok-cheon as Gabriel Jang (ep 6)
Han Seol-ah as Han Mina (ep 6)
Shim Yi-young as Park Hae-ri (ep 7)
Dong Hyun Kim as killer (ep 7)
Kim Hyun-sook as Lee Young-ae (ep 8)
Yoo Hyung-kwan as Yoo Hyung-kwan (ep 8)
Jung Ji-soon as Jung Ji-soon (ep 8)
Im Seo-yeon as Byun Ji-won (ep 8)
Yoon Seo-hyun as Yoon Seo-hyun (ep 8)
Jang Hyun-sung as Jang Chul-oh (ep 10)
Denotes crossover characters from Rude Miss Young-ae.

Ratings

Reception
In its first season, the series topped its time-slot for 11 consecutive weeks, and recorded a peak viewership rating of 4.3%, the highest for a Korean cable drama in 2011.

It was exported to several foreign countries, including Japan, where it aired on cable channel BS-TBS.

See also
 The Vampire Detective (spin-off)
List of vampire television series

References

External links
Vampire Prosecutor – Season 1 official OCN website 
Vampire Prosecutor – Season 2 official OCN website 

15 найкращих дорам про вампірів на вечір!

OCN television dramas
2011 South Korean television series debuts
Korean-language television shows
Vampire detective shows
South Korean fantasy television series
South Korean crime television series
2012 South Korean television series endings
Television series about prosecutors